Robert D. Sorrells (June 29, 1930 – June 11, 2019) was an American television actor. He died in prison while serving an indeterminate life sentence for murder.

Acting career
As an actor, Sorrells is probably best known for his role as the baseball-pitching robot Casey in the Twilight Zone episode "The Mighty Casey". Additionally, he was in 26 episodes of Ensign O'Toole. He was also known for his appearances in Westerns such as Gunsmoke, Rawhide and Bonanza. He later appeared in films such as Fletch and Bound for Glory.

Murder and attempted murder convictions
On July 24, 2004, Sorrells was drinking in a bar in Simi Valley, California, when he became belligerent. Another patron, Arthur DeLong, forcibly escorted Sorrells from the bar. Sorrells went home, got his pistol, and returned to the bar, where he shot DeLong in the back at point-blank range, killing him. Sorrells then shot a bystander named Edward Sanchez, with whom he had had no previous interaction. He then fled the scene in a Volkswagen van, but was arrested a short distance away.

Sorrells was charged with one count of premeditated murder and one count of attempted premeditated murder. Sorrells initially pled not guilty by reason of insanity, but entered a guilty plea in May 2005. In July 2005 he was sentenced to 32 years to life.
Robert Sorrells, 88, died Thursday, June 11, 2019, in prison at Vacaville, California.

Filmography

References

External links

1930 births
20th-century American male actors
American male film actors
American male television actors
American people convicted of murder
American people convicted of attempted murder
2019 deaths
Male actors from California
People convicted of murder by California
Prisoners who died in California detention